The 1951-52 Honduran Amateur League was the fifth edition of the Honduran Amateur League, Sula de La Lima defeated F.C. Motagua 4–3 in the final match played in San Pedro Sula.  The season ran from 2 September 1951 to 30 March 1952.

Regional champions
For the first time the department of Valle included a team to participate in the national championship.

Known results

National championship round
Played in a double round-robin format between the regional champions.  Also known as the Pentagonal.

Known results

Sula's lineup

References

Liga Amateur de Honduras seasons
Honduras
1951 in Honduras
1952 in Honduras